Jerome Max Keli'i Holloway (born December 4, 1991) is an American professional mixed martial artist. He currently competes in the Featherweight division in the Ultimate Fighting Championship (UFC). A professional since 2010, Holloway became the UFC Featherweight Champion when he defeated José Aldo on June 3, 2017, before defending the title three times. As of February 14, 2022, he is #2 in UFC featherweight rankings, and #15 in the UFC men's pound-for-pound rankings.

Background
Holloway was born on Honolulu, Hawaii, and raised in Waianae, an area known for fist fighting. He is of Native Hawaiian and Samoan ancestry. Holloway's parents were heavy drug users, his mother Missy Kapoi being a crystal meth consumer who later recovered. His father, Mark Holloway, who constantly abused his mother, left when Max was around 11 years old. He started training kickboxing in 2007 at the end of his sophomore year, aged 15, out of Team Ruthless, and went on to win his first amateur bout in the sport after three days of training. He graduated from Waianae High School in 2010.

Mixed martial arts career

Early MMA career
At the age of 19, Holloway had amassed a record of 4–0. He gained recognition as the #7 featherweight prospect of 2012 in Bloody Elbow's 2012 World MMA Scouting Report and was compared with former UFC and former WEC lightweight champion Anthony Pettis, due to his ability to incorporate a wide array of flying and spinning kicks, knees and elbows into his striking game.

His early career was highlighted by a split decision win over former Strikeforce and WEC veteran Harris Sarimento on March 12, 2011, earning himself the lightweight strap for the Hawaii-based X-1 promotion.

Ultimate Fighting Championship

2012 
Holloway was the youngest fighter on the UFC roster when he made his promotional debut as an injury replacement for Ricardo Lamas at UFC 143 on February 4, 2012, against Dustin Poirier. He lost the fight via submission (mounted triangle armbar) in the first round.

In his second fight, Holloway faced Pat Schilling on June 1, 2012, at The Ultimate Fighter 15 Finale. Holloway won via unanimous decision (30–27, 30–27, 30–27).

Holloway defeated Justin Lawrence, on August 11, 2012, at UFC 150. Holloway won the fight via TKO in the second round.

Holloway fought Leonard Garcia on December 29, 2012, at UFC 155, replacing an injured Cody McKenzie. Holloway won the close fight via split decision.

2013 
Holloway faced Dennis Bermudez on May 25, 2013, at UFC 160. He lost the fight controversially via split decision. 11 out of 11 media members scored the fight in favor of Holloway.

Holloway faced Conor McGregor on August 17, 2013, at UFC Fight Night 26. He lost the fight via unanimous decision.

2014 
Holloway faced promotional newcomer Will Chope on January 4, 2014, at UFC Fight Night 34. Holloway won the fight via TKO in the second round. The win also earned Holloway his first Knockout of the Night bonus.

Holloway faced Andre Fili on April 26, 2014, at UFC 172. He won the back-and-forth fight after submitting Fili in the third round.

Holloway was expected to face Mirsad Bektić on August 23, 2014, at UFC Fight Night 49, replacing an injured Ernest Chavez. However, Bektic pulled out of the bout in the week leading up to the event and was replaced by promotional newcomer Clay Collard. Holloway won the fight via TKO in the third round.

Holloway again served as a replacement and faced Akira Corassani on October 4, 2014, at UFC Fight Night 53, filling in for Chan Sung Jung. He won the fight via knockout in the first round. The win earned Holloway his first Performance of the Night bonus award.

2015 
Holloway faced Cole Miller on February 15, 2015, at UFC Fight Night 60. Holloway won via unanimous decision.

Holloway faced Cub Swanson on April 18, 2015, at UFC on Fox 15. Holloway finished the fight with a mounted guillotine in the third round. The win also earned Holloway his second Performance of the Night bonus award.

Holloway faced Charles Oliveira on August 23, 2015, at UFC Fight Night 74. He won the fight via TKO in the first round after Oliveira suffered an apparent neck/shoulder injury while defending a takedown and was unable to continue. The injury was later described as a micro-tear in his esophagus, although the UFC later released a statement clarifying that Oliveira had no major injuries. With the win, Holloway became the youngest fighter in UFC history to get 10 wins.

Holloway faced Jeremy Stephens on December 12, 2015, at UFC 194. Holloway won the fight via unanimous decision.

2016 
Holloway faced Ricardo Lamas on June 4, 2016, at UFC 199. He won via unanimous decision.

Holloway faced Anthony Pettis for the interim UFC Featherweight Championship on December 10, 2016, at UFC 206. At the weigh-ins, Pettis came in at 148 lbs., three pounds over the featherweight limit of 145 lbs. for a championship fight. As a result, in case Pettis were to win the fight with Holloway, he would be ineligible for the UFC championship. Pettis was also fined 20% of his purse, which went to Holloway and the bout proceeded at a catchweight. Holloway won the fight via TKO in the third round and was awarded a Performance of the Night bonus.

2017 
Holloway faced the featherweight champion José Aldo in a title unification bout on June 3, 2017, at UFC 212. After facing some early adversity, Holloway defeated Aldo via TKO in the third round and earned his first Fight of the Night bonus award for the bout.

On October 4, 2017, Holloway revealed that he had signed a new multi-fight deal with UFC. Holloway was expected to face Frankie Edgar on December 2, 2017, at UFC 218; however, on November 8, 2017, Edgar withdrew from the card due to injury and was replaced by José Aldo. Holloway won the fight via TKO in the third round and retained the UFC Featherweight belt.

2018 
The bout with Edgar was rescheduled and was expected to take place on March 3, 2018, at UFC 222. However, it was announced on February 3, 2018, that Holloway had been forced to pull out of the bout due to a leg injury.

On April 1, 2018, Holloway was announced as a late replacement for the injured Tony Ferguson in a fight for the vacant undisputed UFC Lightweight Championship at UFC 223 against Khabib Nurmagomedov to be held on April 7, 2018. If victorious, Holloway would be only the second fighter (behind Conor McGregor) in UFC history to hold titles in two different divisions simultaneously. Holloway, who had no fight scheduled and was not in a training camp, accepted the fight with only six days to prepare. On April 6, as he was due to weigh in, Holloway was pulled from the card by New York State Athletic Commission doctors due to the severity of his short-notice weight cut. The bout continued with Al Iaquinta as a last minute replacement for Holloway.

Holloway was then scheduled to defend his UFC Featherweight Championship title on July 7, 2018, at UFC 226 against Brian Ortega. However, on July 4, Holloway was pulled from the fight due to "concussion like symptoms".

For his second title defense, Holloway faced Brian Ortega in the main event at UFC 231 in Toronto, Canada on December 8, 2018. Holloway won the fight via TKO at the end of fourth round by doctor stoppage. This win earned him the Fight of the Night and Performance of the Night awards. Holloway broke the record for most significant strikes in one fight with 290, broke the record for landing 134 of those significant strikes in a round, and set the record for most victories in UFC featherweight history with fifteen.

2019 
Holloway moved up a weight class and faced Dustin Poirier in a rematch for the interim UFC Lightweight Championship on April 13, 2019, at UFC 236. He lost the back-and-forth fight by unanimous decision. This fight earned him the Fight of the Night award.

Holloway came back down to featherweight, and a bout against former UFC lightweight champion Frankie Edgar was scheduled a third time and eventually took place on July 27, 2019, in the main event of UFC 240. Holloway won the fight by unanimous decision, successfully defending his featherweight title for a third time.

In his fourth title defense, Holloway faced Alexander Volkanovski on December 14, 2019, at UFC 245. He lost the fight via unanimous decision, ending his featherweight reign.

2020 
Holloway faced Alexander Volkanovski in a rematch for the UFC Featherweight Championship on July 12 at UFC 251. He lost the fight via split decision. This decision was controversial amongst media outlets, with 18 out of 27 media scores giving it to Holloway, mixed martial arts personalities such as UFC president Dana White, former referee and creator of the rules system John McCarthy and multiple mixed martial artists.

2021 

Holloway faced Calvin Kattar on January 16, 2021, headlining UFC on ABC 1. Holloway dominated Kattar for all 5 rounds and won by unanimous decision, with two judges scoring the fight 50–43 and one judge scoring it 50–42 in his favor. During the last two minutes of the fifth round, Holloway landed a two-punch combo and proceeded to stare at the commentary team sitting cage-side and talk to them, while effortlessly dodging Kattar's strikes and yelling "I'm the best boxer in the UFC!" to him, which generated talk about an homage to Muhammad Ali, known for his showboating. Holloway set the UFC single-fight records for total strikes landed and attempted, significant strikes landed and attempted, strike differential, distance strikes landed, significant head strikes landed and significant body strikes landed. His fourth-round also set the record for strikes and significant strikes landed. Both fighters earned the Fight of the Night award.

Holloway was scheduled to face Yair Rodríguez on July 17, 2021, at UFC on ESPN 26. On June 17, 2021, reports stated that Holloway was forced to pull out of the fight with Rodríguez due to injury.

Holloway faced Yair Rodríguez on November 13, 2021, at UFC Fight Night 197. He won the fight via unanimous decision. Both fighters earned the Fight of the Night award.

2022 

Holloway was scheduled to face Alexander Volkanovski for the UFC Featherweight Championship on March 5, 2022, at UFC 272. However, a day after the third title fight announcement, Holloway was forced to pull from the event due to injury. The trilogy bout was rescheduled to occur at UFC 276 on July 2, 2022. Holloway lost the bout via unanimous decision.

2023 
Holloway is scheduled to face Arnold Allen on April 15, 2023 at UFC on ESPN 44.

Personal life
Holloway married his long-time girlfriend Kaimana Pa'aluhi in 2012, with whom he has one son, Rush Holloway. The couple separated in 2014 before divorcing in 2017. Holloway began dating Hawaiian pro surfer Alessa Quizon in early 2020 and they got married on April 16, 2022.

Championships and accomplishments
Ultimate Fighting Championship
UFC Featherweight Championship (One time)
Three successful title defenses
Interim UFC Featherweight Championship (One time)
Knockout of the Night (One time) vs. 
Fight of the Night (Five times) vs. 
Performance of the Night (Four times) vs. 
First American to win the UFC Featherweight Championship
 Tied for third longest winning streak in UFC history (13) (w. Jon Jones, Demetrious Johnson, Georges St-Pierre, Khabib Nurmagomedov)
Longest winning streak in the UFC Featherweight division history (13)
Second most fights in UFC Featherweight division history (24)
Most wins in the UFC Featherweight division history (18)
Most KO/TKO wins in the UFC Featherweight division history (8)
Most finishes in the UFC Featherweight division history (10)
Tied for most post-fight bonuses in UFC Featherweight division history (9) (with Cub Swanson & Yair Rodríguez)
Most significant strikes landed in a fight in UFC history (+445 vs. Calvin Kattar)
Most overall significant strikes landed in UFC history (2975)
Most total fight time in the UFC Featherweight division history (6:12:00)
Third most total fight time in UFC history (6:50:47)
Most total strikes landed in UFC history (3217)
Most significant strikes attempted in a fight in UFC history (+744 vs. Calvin Kattar)
Most distance strikes landed in a fight in UFC history (+439 vs. Calvin Kattar)
Most significant head strikes landed in a fight in UFC history (+274 vs. Calvin Kattar)
Most significant body strikes landed in a fight in UFC history (+117 vs. Calvin Kattar)
Most significant strikes landed in a round in UFC history (+141 vs. Calvin Kattar)
Most significant strikes landed in a fight in UFC history (+445 vs. Calvin Kattar)
Most strikes attempted in a fight in UFC history (+746 vs. Calvin Kattar)
Highest significant strike differential in a fight in UFC history (+312 vs. Calvin Kattar)
2021 UFC Forrest Griffin Community Award
X-1 World Events
X-1 Lightweight Championship (One time)
World MMA Awards
2017 Charles 'Mask' Lewis Fighter of the Year
MMAMania.com
UFC/MMA 'Fighter of the Year' 2017 - Top 5 List #1
RealSport
2017 Fighter of the Year
Pundit Arena
2017 Fighter of the Year
MMAFighting.com
2017 Fighter of the Year
BishopSportsNetwork.com
2017 Fighter of the Year
MMADNA.nl
2018 Performance of the Year
Sherdog
2021 Beatdown of the Year vs. Calvin Kattar

Mixed martial arts record

|-
|Loss
|align=center|23–7
|Alexander Volkanovski
|Decision (unanimous)
|UFC 276
| 
|align=center|5
|align=center|5:00
|Las Vegas, Nevada, United States
|
|-
|Win
|align=center|23–6
|Yair Rodríguez
|Decision (unanimous)
|UFC Fight Night: Holloway vs. Rodríguez
|
|align=center|5
|align=center|5:00
|Las Vegas, Nevada, United States
|
|-
|Win
|align=center|22–6
|Calvin Kattar
|Decision (unanimous)
|UFC on ABC: Holloway vs. Kattar
|
|align=center|5
|align=center|5:00
|Abu Dhabi, United Arab Emirates
|
|-
|-
|Loss
|align=center|21–6
|Alexander Volkanovski
|Decision (split)
|UFC 251 
|
|align=center|5
|align=center|5:00
|Abu Dhabi, United Arab Emirates
|
|-
|Loss
|align=center|21–5
|Alexander Volkanovski
|Decision (unanimous)
|UFC 245 
|
|align=center|5
|align=center|5:00
|Las Vegas, Nevada, United States
|
|-
|Win
|align=center|21–4
|Frankie Edgar
|Decision (unanimous)
|UFC 240 
|
|align=center|5
|align=center|5:00
|Edmonton, Alberta, Canada
|
|-
|Loss
|align=center|20–4
|Dustin Poirier
|Decision (unanimous)
|UFC 236
|
|align=center|5
|align=center|5:00
|Atlanta, Georgia, United States 
|
|-
|Win
|align=center|20–3
|Brian Ortega
|TKO (doctor stoppage)
|UFC 231
|
|align=center|4
|align=center|5:00
|Toronto, Ontario, Canada
|
|-
|Win
|align=center|19–3
|José Aldo
|TKO (punches)
|UFC 218
|
|align=center|3
|align=center|4:51
|Detroit, Michigan, United States
|
|-
|Win
|align=center|18–3
|José Aldo
|TKO (punches)
|UFC 212
|
|align=center|3
|align=center|4:13
|Rio de Janeiro, Brazil
|
|-
|Win
|align=center|17–3
|Anthony Pettis
|TKO (body kick and punches)
|UFC 206
|
|align=center|3
|align=center|4:50
|Toronto, Ontario, Canada
|
|-
|Win
|align=center|16–3
|Ricardo Lamas
|Decision (unanimous)
|UFC 199
|
|align=center|3
|align=center|5:00
|Inglewood, California, United States
|
|-
|Win
|align=center|15–3
|Jeremy Stephens
|Decision (unanimous)
|UFC 194
|
|align=center|3
|align=center|5:00
|Las Vegas, Nevada, United States
|
|-
|Win
|align=center|14–3
|Charles Oliveira
|TKO (esophagus injury) 
|UFC Fight Night: Holloway vs. Oliveira
|
|align=center|1
|align=center|1:39
|Saskatoon, Saskatchewan, Canada
|
|-
|Win
|align=center|13–3
|Cub Swanson
|Submission (guillotine choke)
|UFC on Fox: Machida vs. Rockhold
|
|align=center|3
|align=center|3:58
|Newark, New Jersey, United States
||
|-
|Win
|align=center|12–3
|Cole Miller
|Decision (unanimous)
|UFC Fight Night: Henderson vs. Thatch
|
|align=center|3
|align=center|5:00
|Broomfield, Colorado, United States
|
|-
|Win
|align=center|11–3
|Akira Corassani
|KO (punches)
|UFC Fight Night: Nelson vs. Story
|
|align=center|1
|align=center|3:11
|Stockholm, Sweden
|
|-
|Win
|align=center|10–3
|Clay Collard
|TKO (punches)
|UFC Fight Night: Henderson vs. dos Anjos
|
|align=center|3
|align=center|3:47
|Tulsa, Oklahoma, United States
|
|-
|Win
|align=center|9–3
|Andre Fili
|Submission (guillotine choke)
|UFC 172
|
|align=center|3
|align=center|3:39
|Baltimore, Maryland, United States
|
|-
|Win
|align=center|8–3
|Will Chope
|TKO (punches)
|UFC Fight Night: Saffiedine vs. Lim
|
|align=center|2
|align=center|2:27
|Marina Bay, Singapore
|
|-
|Loss
|align=center|7–3
|Conor McGregor
|Decision (unanimous)
|UFC Fight Night: Shogun vs. Sonnen
|
|align=center|3
|align=center|5:00
|Boston, Massachusetts, United States
|
|-
|Loss
|align=center|7–2
|Dennis Bermudez
|Decision (split)
|UFC 160
|
|align=center|3
|align=center|5:00
|Las Vegas, Nevada, United States
|
|-
|Win
|align=center|7–1
|Leonard Garcia
|Decision (split)
|UFC 155
|
|align=center|3
|align=center|5:00
|Las Vegas, Nevada, United States
|
|-
|Win
|align=center|6–1
|Justin Lawrence
|TKO (punches)
|UFC 150
|
|align=center|2
|align=center|4:49
|Denver, Colorado, United States
|
|-
|Win
|align=center|5–1
|Pat Schilling
|Decision (unanimous)
|The Ultimate Fighter: Live Finale
|
|align=center|3
|align=center|5:00
|Las Vegas, Nevada, United States
|
|-
|Loss
|align=center|4–1
|Dustin Poirier
|Submission (triangle armbar)
|UFC 143
|
|align=center|1
|align=center|3:23
|Las Vegas, Nevada, United States
|
|-
|Win
|align=center|4–0
|Eddie Rincon
|Decision (unanimous)
|UIC 4: War on the Valley Isle
|
|align=center|3
|align=center|5:00
|Honolulu, Hawaii, United States
|
|-
|Win
|align=center|3–0
|Harris Sarmiento
|Decision (split)
|X-1: Champions 3
|
|align=center|5
|align=center|5:00
|Honolulu, Hawaii, United States
|
|-
|Win
|align=center|2–0
|Bryson Kamaka
|KO (punches)
|X-1: Island Pride
|
|align=center|1
|align=center|3:09
|Honolulu, Hawaii, United States
|
|-
|Win
|align=center|1–0
|Duke Saragosa
|Decision (unanimous)
|X-1: Heroes
|
|align=center|3
|align=center|5:00
|Honolulu, Hawaii, United States
|

Pay-per-view bouts

See also
List of current UFC fighters
List of male mixed martial artists
Ultimate Fighting Championship Pound for Pound rankings

References

External links

 
 

|-

1991 births
Living people
Native Hawaiian sportspeople
American sportspeople of Samoan descent
American male mixed martial artists
Samoan male mixed martial artists
Mixed martial artists from Hawaii
Polynesian American
People from Oahu
People from Honolulu County, Hawaii
Ultimate Fighting Championship champions
Featherweight mixed martial artists
Mixed martial artists utilizing kickboxing
Mixed martial artists utilizing Brazilian jiu-jitsu
Ultimate Fighting Championship male fighters
American practitioners of Brazilian jiu-jitsu
Samoan practitioners of Brazilian jiu-jitsu